Irene Rocas i Romaguera (1861-1947) was a Catalan folklorist and lexicographer. Her works contributed to the research on Empordà language and literature. One of the most notable of these was the Diccionari català-valencià-balear, a collaboration with the Majorcan author Mossèn Alcover. She was the mother of the Spanish writer, folklorist, and academic, Maria Gracia Bassa i Rocas.

Biography 
Rocas i Romaguera was born in Llofriu on August 10, 1861, to an Empordà family. Her upbringing was described as conservative with strong religious conviction and Catalan influence. She would display the same convictions and values in her adult and family life. In 1882, Romaguera was married to Joan Bassa i Bosch, an Indian who was twenty years her senior and a resident of Llofriu. In 1908, her husband died, leaving her to raise those who remained of their nine children M. Gràcia, Aniceta, Ernesta, Florenci, M. Àngels, Serafí, Lluís, M. Montserrat, and Maria. Some of these died in their infancy.

Rocas immigrated to Argentina and settled in Buenos Aires. She started publishing her written works in the attempt to promote the Catalan language, values, and culture. She collaborated with l'Arxiu d'Etnografia i Folklore de Catalunya and the l'Arxiu de l'Obra del Cançoner Popular de Catalunya. Her works for these institutions included a compendium of corrandes, fables, and paremias. Her connections with the Catalan intelligentsia allowed her to practice her profession as a lexicographer. Rocas collaborated with Alcover in the production of a dictionary of the Catalan language beginning in 1911. This publication had more than 15,000 entries from the Emporda language. 

Some of Rocas's published works include Refranys i dites populars de Llofriu, recollides per Irene Rocas. She was also the subject of the text written by Dolors Grau released in 2004 called, Memories per Irene Rocas (1861-1910): un testimoni excepcional des de l'Emporda, Olot i Barcelona.

Rocas heavily influenced her daughter Gracia, who also settled in Argentina and worked as a journalist. Gracia also became a folklorist and was instrumental in publishing a number of her mother's works. She died on February 5, 1947, in Buenos Aires.

References 

1861 births
1947 deaths
People from Buenos Aires
Catalan-language writers
Linguists from Catalonia
Spanish women writers
Members of the Institute for Catalan Studies
Lexicographers of Catalan
20th-century lexicographers